Peter Brezovan (born 9 December 1979) is a Slovak former footballer who played as a goalkeeper.

Career

Early career
Brezovan began his career in his native Slovakia with PS Bratislava followed by moves to Vinohrady Bratislava, SKP Devín, Slovan Břeclav, 1. HFK Olomouc before joining 1. FC Brno. Brezovan played for FK Inter Bratislava on loan before he was spotted by Swindon Town boss Dennis Wise during a trial at Crewe Alexandra.

Swindon Town (loan)
Wise signed the Slovak on a season long loan with view to make the deal permanent later. His Swindon debut came on the opening day of the 2006/07 campaign – away at Hartlepool United, Brezovan saved two Hartlepool penalties from Joel Porter and Ritchie Humphreys. Swindon finished 1–0 winners. Following his heroics in the game against Hartlepool and a string of impressive displays, Peter was awarded the PFA Player of the Month award for September.
Falling awkwardly in the 76th minute of the home game against Grimsby Town on 14 October 2006, which Swindon won 3–0, Brezovan suffered a broken arm.

Swindon Town
On 29 March 2007 it was confirmed that he had signed a two-year contract with Swindon. He saved two penalties on his debut for Swindon.

In September 2007 he spent two days on trial with Everton.

In October 2009 he was on trial at Crewe Alexandra but was not offered a contract.

Brighton & Hove Albion
He went on trial with Brighton and Hove Albion in December He subsequently signed a short-term deal keeping him at the club until January 2010. He made an immediate debut on 5 December in a 1–0 away win against Exeter City; a game in which he also saved a penalty. He stayed with the club for four and a half years before being released in May 2014.

Portsmouth
On 18 August 2014 he signed for Portsmouth on a short-term, non-contract basis. Mainly a backup to Paul Jones, he left the club on 1 September.

Tranmere Rovers
On 1 September 2014, transfer deadline day, Brezovan signed for League Two side Tranmere Rovers on a one-year deal. He made his debut for the club on 6 September in a 3–2 loss to Accrington Stanley. He made six more starts before losing his place for a long-serving Tranmere Rovers goalkeeper Owain Fon Williams.

Peter joined Southport on a one-month loan on 27 February 2015. He made his debut one day later, in a 5–3 loss at Forest Green. The team's form saw a turnaround with Brezovan in goal as he then kept four clean sheets in the next five games, helping Southport to four wins and a draw. He was recalled by Tranmere on 21 March 2015, after Owain Fon Williams was called up to the Wales Squad. At the end of the season, with Tranmere Rovers relegated from League Two, Brezovan was released by the club.

Personal life
Peter is married and has one child named Samuel.

References

External links
 
 
 
 Peter Brezovan profile at www.seagulls.co.uk

1979 births
Living people
Slovak footballers
Czech First League players
1. HFK Olomouc players
FC Zbrojovka Brno players
FK Inter Bratislava players
Swindon Town F.C. players
Brighton & Hove Albion F.C. players
Portsmouth F.C. players
Tranmere Rovers F.C. players
English Football League players
Association football goalkeepers
Slovak expatriate footballers
Slovak expatriate sportspeople in England
Footballers from Bratislava